Sverka is a small river in the municipality of Namsos in Trøndelag county, Norway. It flows from the lakes called Finnvollvatnet and Furudalsvatnet northeast past the Sverkmoen area to the lake Øyungen. At Øyungen, it joins the river Øyensåa which continues until it joins with the Ferja river. There, it becomes the river Årgårdselva which flows to the Namsenfjorden. There is good salmon fishing in the lower parts of the river.

See also
List of rivers in Norway

References

Namsos
Rivers of Trøndelag
Rivers of Norway